The 1961 Virginia Cavaliers football team represented the University of Virginia during the 1961 NCAA University Division football season. The Cavaliers were led by first-year head coach Bill Elias and played their home games at Scott Stadium in Charlottesville, Virginia. They competed as members of the Atlantic Coast Conference, finishing in last. Despite the last place finish, Elias was named ACC Coach of the Year, becoming the second in conference history to win the award in a coach's first year at the school. Elias, who had been the Southern Conference Coach of the Year the previous season at George Washington, snapped Virginia's 28 game losing streak by beating William & Mary in the first game of the season. Their win against South Carolina snapped an 18-game losing streak against ACC foes.

Schedule

References

Virginia
Virginia Cavaliers football seasons
Virginia Cavaliers football